The Porter Rodgers Sr. House was a historic house at the junction of North Oak and East Race Streets in Searcy, Arkansas.  It was a -story wood-frame structure, with a side-gable roof, weatherboard siding, and a concrete foundation.  A cross-gabled Greek Revival portico, two stories in height, projected from the center of its roof line, supported by fluted square box columns.   It was built in 1925, and was one of the city's best examples of high-style Colonial Revival architecture.

The house was listed on the National Register of Historic Places in 1991. It has been listed as destroyed in the Arkansas Historic Preservation Program database, and was delisted in 2018.

See also
National Register of Historic Places listings in White County, Arkansas

References

Houses on the National Register of Historic Places in Arkansas
Colonial Revival architecture in Arkansas
Houses completed in 1925
Houses in Searcy, Arkansas
Demolished buildings and structures in Arkansas
National Register of Historic Places in Searcy, Arkansas
Former National Register of Historic Places in Arkansas
1925 establishments in Arkansas